The 2002 Ivy League Baseball Championship Series took place at Bill Clarke Field in Princeton, New Jersey on May 11, 2002.  The series matched the regular season champions of each of the league's two divisions.  , the winner of the series, claimed their fourth title and the Ivy League's automatic berth in the 2002 NCAA Division I baseball tournament.  Harvard made their fifth appearance in the series, and faced Princeton for the fifth time in seventh years.  Harvard also won in 1997, 1998, and 1999.
It was Princeton's seventh appearance in the Championship Series, all of which were consecutive.  Harvard won a playoff game against Brown on May 8 in Cambridge, Massachusetts to advance to the Championship Series.

Results

References

Ivy League Baseball Championship Series
Tournament
Ivy League Baseball Championship Series